Eurysthaea is a genus of flies in the family Tachinidae.

Species
 E. cinctella Mesnil, 1953
 E. leveriana Baranov, 1934
 E. scutellaris (Robineau-Desvoidy, 1849)

References

Exoristinae
Diptera of Europe
Diptera of Asia
Tachinidae genera
Taxa named by Jean-Baptiste Robineau-Desvoidy